Florence "Flo" Whyard (January 13, 1917 – April 23, 2012) was a Canadian politician and former newspaper editor of the Whitehorse Star.

In 1974,  at the age of 57, she was elected to the Yukon Territorial Council, representing the Whitehorse West constituency. She served as a minister of the Yukon territorial cabinet from 1975 to 1978. She was elected the mayor of Whitehorse, the capital and largest city of Yukon. She served as mayor from 1982 to 1984, and shepherded the construction of the city's Macauley Lodge. Whyard died on April 23, 2012, in Whitehorse at the age of 95.

References

1917 births
2012 deaths
Canadian newspaper editors
Mayors of Whitehorse
Members of the Yukon Territorial Council
Politicians from London, Ontario
Women mayors of places in Yukon
Women MLAs in Yukon
Women newspaper editors